Michael Johnson is an American educator who previously served as Commissioner of the Department of Education & Early Development of Alaska. Prior to that he served in the Copper River School District as superintendent, school principal, district curriculum and staff development director, elementary teacher and special education program assistant. He announced his retirement on June 8th, 2022, and officially left office June 30th, 2022.

Johnson is a recipient of the Milken Educator Award.

References

1969 births
Alaska Republicans
Date of birth missing (living people)
Living people
People from Juneau, Alaska
Place of birth missing (living people)
School superintendents in Alaska
Schoolteachers from Alaska
State cabinet secretaries of Alaska